Kristy Wallace (born 3 January 1996) is an Australian basketball player for the Indiana Fever of the WNBA and for the Melbourne Boomers of the Women's National Basketball League (WNBL). She played college basketball for the Baylor Lady Bears.

College
Wallace played four seasons of college basketball in the United States for the Baylor Lady Bears. She earned Big 12 All-Freshman Team in 2015 and Big 12 All-Defensive Team and First-team All-Big 12 in 2018.

Baylor statistics

Source

Professional
Wallace was picked in the second round of the 2018 WNBA draft by the Atlanta Dream. She later signed a two-year deal with the Canberra Capitals. A knee injury in her second game with Canberra in late 2018 saw her not play again until 2021 in the NBL1 South with the Melbourne Tigers. She joined the Southside Flyers for the 2021–22 WNBL season and won the WNBL Sixth Woman of the Year Award.

On January 13, 2023, Wallace was traded from the Atlanta Dream to the Indiana Fever.

WNBA career statistics

Regular season

|-
| align="left" | 2022
| align="left" | Atlanta
| 29 || 18 || 20.8 || .407 || .368 || .786 || 2.3 || 2.2 || 0.6 || 0.2 || 1.5 || 6.6
|-
| align="left" | Career
| align="left" | 1 year, 1 team
| 29 || 18 || 20.8 || .407 || .368 || .786 || 2.3 || 2.2 || 0.6 || 0.2 || 1.5 || 6.6

National team

Youth Level
Wallace made her international debut for the Gems at the 2014 FIBA Oceania Under-18 Championship in Fiji. Wallace would then go on to represent the Gems at the Under-19 World Championship in Russia the following year, where they finished in third place and took home the bronze medal.

References

External links
Baylor Lady Bears bio

1996 births
Living people
Atlanta Dream draft picks
Atlanta Dream players
Australian expatriate basketball people in the United States
Australian women's basketball players
Baylor Bears women's basketball players
Guards (basketball)
Universiade gold medalists for Australia
Universiade medalists in basketball
Medalists at the 2017 Summer Universiade
People educated at John Paul College (Brisbane)